Lillian Bohny (born Bertha Eugenie Bohny; May 14, 1903 – December 31, 1997), known professionally as Billie Dove, was an American actress.

Early life and career 
Dove was born Bertha Eugenie Bohny in New York City in 1903 to Charles and Bertha (née Kagl) Bohny, both immigrants from Switzerland. She had a younger brother, Charles Reinhardt Bohny (1906-1963). As a teen, she worked as a model to help support her family and was hired as a teenager by Florenz Ziegfeld to appear in his Ziegfeld Follies Revue. She legally changed her name to Lillian Bohny in the early 1920s and moved to Hollywood, where she began appearing in silent films. She soon became one of the more popular actresses of the 1920s, appearing in Douglas Fairbanks' smash hit Technicolor film The Black Pirate (1926), as Rodeo West in The Painted Angel (1929), and The American Beauty (1927).

She married Irvin Willat, the director of her seventh film, in 1923. The two divorced in 1929. Dove had a legion of male fans, one of her more persistent was Howard Hughes. She had a three-year romance with Hughes and was engaged to marry him, but she ended the relationship.

Hughes cast her as a comedian in his film Cock of the Air (1932). She also appeared in his movie The Age for Love (1931).

Dove was also a pilot, poet, and painter.

Early retirement
Following her last film, Blondie of the Follies (1932), Dove retired from the screen to be with her family. She married wealthy oil executive Robert Alan Kenaston in 1935, a marriage that lasted for 35 years until his death in 1970. The couple had a son, Robert Alan Kenaston, Jr., who married actress Claire Kelly and died in 1995 from cancer, and an adopted daughter, Gail who briefly married media mogul Merv Adelson. Billie Dove later had a brief third marriage, to architect John Miller, which ended in divorce in the 1970s.

Last years
Aside from a cameo in Diamond Head (1963), Dove never returned to the movies. She spent her retirement years in Rancho Mirage, then moved to the Motion Picture & Television Country House and Hospital in Woodland Hills, California where she died of pneumonia on New Year's Eve 1997, aged 94.

She is interred in the Freedom Mausoleum at Forest Lawn Glendale.

Legacy
Dove has a star on the Hollywood Walk of Fame located at 6351 Hollywood Blvd. Jazz singer Billie Holiday took her professional pseudonym from Dove as an admirer of the actress.

Filmography

References

External links

 
 
 Photographs and bibliography for Billie Dove, film.virtual-history.com; accessed February 17, 2015.

1903 births
1997 deaths
American silent film actresses
Deaths from pneumonia in California
People from Greater Los Angeles
Ziegfeld girls
American people of Swiss descent
Burials at Forest Lawn Memorial Park (Glendale)
Women aviators
20th-century American actresses
Actresses from New York City